Birds is a ghost town in Tarrant County, located in the U.S. state of Texas.

References

Ghost towns in North Texas
Ghost towns in Texas